Newton Thomas Gould (May 14, 1843 – April 2, 1925) was a Union Army soldier during the American Civil War. He received the Medal of Honor for gallantry during the Siege of Vicksburg on May 22, 1863. 

Gould joined the 113th Illinois Infantry in August 1862, and was mustered out in June 1865. He died in Sacramento, California on April 2, 1925 and was buried at Old City Cemetery in Sacramento, California.

Union assault
On May 22, 1863, General Ulysses S. Grant ordered an assault on the Confederate heights at Vicksburg, Mississippi. The plan called for a storming party of volunteers to build a bridge across a moat and plant scaling ladders against the enemy embankment in advance of the main attack.
The volunteers knew the odds were against survival and the mission was called, in nineteenth-century vernacular, a "forlorn hope." Only single men were accepted as volunteers and even then, twice as many men as needed came forward and were turned away. The assault began in the early morning following a naval bombardment.
The Union soldiers came under enemy fire immediately and were pinned down in the ditch they were to cross. Despite repeated attacks by the main Union body, the men of the forlorn hope were unable to retreat until nightfall. Of the 150 men in the storming party, nearly half were killed.  Seventy-nine of the survivors were awarded the Medal of Honor.

Medal of Honor citation
"For gallantry in the charge of the volunteer storming party on 22 May 1863."

See also
List of American Civil War Medal of Honor recipients: G-L

References

External links
 
A Forlorn Hope
Vicksburg Medal of Honor Recipients

1843 births
1925 deaths
People from Elk Grove Village, Illinois
People of Illinois in the American Civil War
People of California in the American Civil War
Military personnel from Sacramento, California
Union Army soldiers
United States Army Medal of Honor recipients
American Civil War recipients of the Medal of Honor